"Better Days" is a song by American band OneRepublic, taken from their fifth studio album Human. It was released as the fourth single from that album through Interscope Records on March 25, 2020. It was co-written by frontman Ryan Tedder with bassist Brent Kutzle, John Nathaniel and Tyler Spry. The song was inspired by the COVID-19 pandemic.

Background
The song was inspired by the ongoing COVID-19 pandemic upending lives across the globe according to frontman Ryan Tedder, who said, "We were in the final week of our fifth album deadline when a global pandemic was declared by the WHO. A few of us unknowingly got exposed to somebody with COVID-19 in London and ended up in quarantine in L.A. at my studio for two weeks. With only two songs left to finish, one of them happened to be 'Better Days'. We write about real experiences and events that happen to us - this is what happens when you write a song during a crisis."

Music video
A music video to accompany the release of "Better Days" was first released onto YouTube on April 13, 2020. It depicts life during the pandemic, such as people staying at home and wearing face masks.

Personnel
Credits adapted from Tidal.
 Brent Kutzle – producer, composer, lyricist
 John Nathaniel – producer, composer, lyricist, mixer, studio personnel
 Ryan Tedder – producer, composer, lyricist
 Tyler Spry – producer, co-producer

Charts

Certifications

Release history

References

2020 songs
2020 singles
OneRepublic songs
Cultural responses to the COVID-19 pandemic
Songs written by Ryan Tedder
Songs written by Brent Kutzle
Songs about the COVID-19 pandemic